5F-SDB-006 is a drug that acts as a potent agonist for the cannabinoid receptors, with an EC50 of 50 nM for human CB1 receptors, and 123 nM for human CB2 receptors. It was discovered during research into the related compound APICA which had been sold illicitly as "2NE1". 5F-SDB-006 is the terminally fluorinated analog of SDB-006, just as STS-135 is the terminally fluorinated analog of APICA. Given the known metabolic liberation (and presence as an impurity) of amantadine in the related compound APINACA, it is suspected that metabolic hydrolysis of the amide group of 5F-SDB-006 may release benzylamine.

See also 
 APICA
 APINACA
 CUMYL-PICA
 CUMYL-PINACA
 CUMYL-THPINACA
 5F-CUMYL-PINACA
 SDB-006
 STS-135
 XLR-11

References 

Cannabinoids
Designer drugs
Indolecarboxamides
Organofluorides